Aechmea leucolepis is a plant species in the genus Aechmea. This species is endemic to eastern Brazil from Bahia to Espírito Santo.

References

leucolepis
Flora of Brazil
Plants described in 1955